The 2013 J.League Division 1 season was the 48th season of Japanese top-flight football and 21st since the establishment of the J.League. The season began on 2 March and finished on 7 December.

Sanfrecce Hiroshima are the defending champions.

Clubs
Vissel Kobe, Gamba Osaka and Consadole Sapporo were relegated at the end of the 2012 season after finishing in the bottom three places of the table. Consadole Sapporo returned to J2 after only one season in the top flight, while Vissel Kobe was relegated after six seasons in the top flight. Gamba Osaka, instead, was relegated for the first time since the creation of J. League in 1993 and first time since their forerunners, Matsushita Electric Soccer Club, were relegated to the second Division of Japan Soccer League after the 1986–87 season.

The three relegated teams were replaced by 2012 J.League Division 2 champions Ventforet Kofu, runners-up Shonan Bellmare and sixth-placed and play-off winner team Oita Trinita. Kofu made an immediate return to the top division, while Shonan after a two-year absence. In the end, Oita beat JEF United Chiba in the playoff final and returned in J1 after three seasons in the second division. Due to Oita's promotion, it will be the first time to have 2 clubs in the top-flight league competitions from Kyushu since 2006, and Kansai region will have only one club competing in the top flight first time since 1994 season due to Kobe and Gamba's relegations.

Foreign players

League table

Results

Top scorers

Updated to games played on 7 December 2013
Source: J. League

Awards

Player of the Month

Best XI

Attendances

References

J1 League seasons
1
Japan
Japan